Uruhuasia is a genus of parasitic flies in the family Tachinidae. There are at least two described species in Uruhuasia.

Species
These two species belong to the genus Uruhuasia:
 Uruhuasia cruciata Townsend, 1914
 Uruhuasia delta Townsend, 1914

References

Further reading

 
 
 
 

Tachinidae
Articles created by Qbugbot